The table displays the 28 smallest official cities in the United Kingdom across three measures. Most of these appear in all three of the following categories:

 Area (body): This default sort ranks the physically smallest 20 local government areas (parish/community, district, county) and built-up areas that have city status
 Area (locale): 21 cities with the smallest same-name built-up area (many cities have much countryside and multiple settlements within their boundaries)
 Census population: 26 cities around 100,000 residents and fewer since the 2001 census

For the list of all 69 cities, and with additional information, see List of cities in the United Kingdom.

Lichfield, Hereford and Salisbury, in addition to being some of the smallest cities in England, are among the most populous civil parishes.

The least populous cities on all of British territory are Jamestown in St Helena, Ascension and Tristan da Cunha (pop. 629) and Hamilton in Bermuda (pop. 854).

See also

Notes 

 Dashes mean no rank is given or that no local body exists. Missing body or locale statistics use the amounts shown in the other.
 Statistics in italics have been added for completion of the table. These are in numerical but non-ranking order.
 English cities prefixed 'City of...' are districts so named to distinguish them from a namesake settlement area which does not have city status, with the City of London having additional county status. All of these except London have several communities and suburbs within their boundaries, with most containing large swathes of countryside, extra settlements and sometimes parishes/communities.
 The area (body) measurement is the size of a localised council area which is designated as a city, if there is one. See the Body column for their local government type. These council area boundaries are well-defined, and cities are typically awarded the honour via parish or principal governing public bodies, so it is used as the primary sizing definition. Most in the table are parishes (England) or communities (Wales), except for the City of London (county). Several districts that hold city status are shown as the areas become larger; these are named after their only settlement or largest town in the case of multiple settlements. Cities can also be boroughs, which are simply a honorific title for districts. In Scotland and Northern Ireland (see note), wider council areas can hold the title on behalf of a city urban area much like a charter trust (see note), and in Northern Ireland particularly, these mainly have multiple place names in their titles, so the area (body) does not apply in these cases. The column also substitutes the locale size (see note) when there is no local body, as a second definition to rank the physical size of the cities. Some local legal entity types such as communities in Scotland or townlands in Northern Ireland do not at present hold city status.
The area (locale) reflects the built up area that most closely corresponds to the urban area of the named city settlement, which means for many small cities that much of the area is rural land. It is listed for comparison with the public body measurement. It is used in the statistics instead of the body size where there is no local government entity, e.g. unparished area with city charter trustees (see note), or cities designated by their urban area (Scotland, Northern Ireland). This is a secondary method of determining physical size; relatively fewer cities are explicitly defined in this way, and their urban area can extend beyond the city boundary. London and Westminster are completely surrounded by a much larger built-up area (Greater London) and so any parkland within these is considered part of their urban landscape. Thus Wells is the smallest standalone city, as it is wholly surrounded by countryside.
Population is for the council body area that has the city status. For cities without an existing public entity such as those within in an unparished area, the population is instead compiled from an agglomeration of electoral wards which cover its urban area (see note) or former district area (see note). Rank column is for 2011 population only.
 Sources:
England and Wales area figures are taken from the ONS Geography Linked Data, DEFRA, AND NOMIS sites.
Scotland cities post-2000 area and population figures are taken from the Scotland Census site and settlement size used as local government areas there are not required to hold the city designation for their full area
Northern Ireland (NI) area and population figures taken from the NISRA site. The cities there formed their own districts until local authority reform in 2015. These settlements now form part of larger council areas, but kept their city statuses through continuing legislation.
 Cities with charter trustees covering prior local government areas (England):

Bath: the city area considered is the present-day 16 electoral wards covering the area of the former borough, in existence until 1996.
Chester: the area shown is the prior City of Chester district active until 2009. Population of wards in 2001 was 118,210; those were not directly mappable in 2011, so local population figures given in table.
Durham: this was parished in 2018, but city charter trustees continue to exist, and so hold the charter on behalf of the city area covered by the much wider Durham city district council until 2009. The 2011 population is that of wards covering the same area. The title is not held by the parish council.

References 

List smallest
Smallest
Cities, smallest
United Kingdom geography-related lists